Rudyszwałd  is a village in the administrative district of Gmina Krzyżanowice, within Racibórz County, Silesian Voivodeship, in southern Poland, close to the Czech border.

The village has an approximate population of 790.

The village was first mentioned in a Latin document of Diocese of Wrocław called Liber fundationis episcopatus Vratislaviensis from around 1305 as item in Rudolfwald debent esse XXIII) mansi. The name, Rudolph plus wald (German: a wood), indicates ethnically German settlement.

References

Villages in Racibórz County